96 Medium Regiment is part of the Regiment of Artillery of the Indian Army.

Formation 
96 Medium Regiment was raised as 96 Composite (Towed) Regiment on 1 March 1964 under the command of Lieutenant Colonel Swarup Singh Rai at Haldwani. It was subsequently converted to a field regiment and is now a medium regiment.

Operations
Indo-Pakistani War of 1965

The regiment was part of a Mountain Division in the Eastern Command. It was tasked to comb for Pakistani para troops and prevent sabotage of oil installations and railways.
Operation Trident
Two batteries moved to the Western sector on 3 February 1987 and one moved to the Southern sector on 21 February 1987 to participate in Operation Brasstacks.
Operation Pawan
The regiment sent a contingent consisting of the Observation Post and Battery Commander to join the Indian Peace Keeping Force (IPKF) in Sri Lanka.
Operation Rakshak
Between 1990 and 1994, the unit was part of Counter Insurgency Operations in Jammu and Kashmir.
Operation Rhino
The regiment was involved in Counter Insurgency Operations in Assam between December 1994 and December 1996.
Operation Parakram
The regiment was part of a Mountain Brigade and was based at the base of Tiger Hill. It provided devastating fire power and helped in capturing dominating heights. For its efforts, it was awarded the Chief of the Army Staff's unit citation on 15 January 2004.
United Nations Disengagement Observer Force

The regiment was part of the United Nations Disengagement Observer Force (UNDOF) in Golan Heights, Syria during 2021-2022.

Achievements
The regiment has won 2 Sena Medals, 12 Chief of the Army Staff's Commendation Cards, 1 General Officer Commanding in Chief's Commendation Card and 2 Corp's Commander's appreciations. It has also won the General Officer Commanding in Chief's (Southern Command) unit citation in 2013 and General Officer Commanding in Chief's (Eastern Command) unit citation in 2017. The unit awarded the coveted 'Head of Mission and Force Commander Unit Appreciation' for its outstanding performance during its tour of duty as part of the UNDOF in 2021.

War Cry
The war cry of the regiment is Veeran Yaar – 96!, 96!, 96!– which translates to Who is the bravest? - 96!, 96!, 96!.

See also
List of artillery regiments of Indian Army

References

Military units and formations established in 1964
Artillery regiments of the Indian Army after 1947